Lupo may refer to:

People
Lupo I or Lupus I of Aquitaine, Duke of Gascony and part of Aquitaine in the 670s
Lupo II of Gascony (died 778), Duke of Gascony
Lupo III Centule of Gascony, Duke of Gascony from 818 to 819
Lupo (surname), persons having the surname Lupo
Lupo, the Italian nickname of Bulgaria-born volleyball player Lyubomir Ganev
 Nickname of Ludwig Paischer, Austrian Judoka

Fictional characters
Lupo (comics), a member of the Savage Land Mutates in the X-Men comics
Lupo, in the Rat-Man comic series
Lupo, in the Fix and Foxi comics series
Cyrus Lupo, lead character in the long-running NBC legal drama Law & Order
Jo Lupo, a supporting character in the SyFy Channel science-fiction program Eureka
Lupo the Butcher, the main character of the two-minute film of the same name

Other uses
 Volkswagen Lupo, a small city car manufactured by Volkswagen
 Lupo-class frigate, ship built for the Italian Navy
Lupo!, Israeli film directed by Menahem Golan
 Lupo Martini Wolfsburg, a German association football club
 Lupo (dog), a dog belonging to Catherine, Duchess of Cambridge